Fashion Cafe was an international restaurant chain that was based in New York City that featured celebrity models and had locations in the United States, United Kingdom, South Africa, Mexico, and Spain.Francesco Buti and Tommaso Buti founded the restaurant in 1995,The business was initially fronted by super models Naomi Campbell, Elle Macpherson, Claudia Schiffer, and Christy Turlington. The Associated Press called the chain "a couture version of Planet Hollywood and the Hard Rock Cafe."

History
The chain first opened in Rockefeller Center, New York City in 1995. On Monday May 6, 1996, construction began on the London branch of the chain, though the London branch went bust in 1999, a year after it opened. The London and New York locations became the primary locations of Fashion Cafe. The Fashion Café’s grand opening was the highlight of that season’s fashion week. Gianni and Donatella Versace, Tyra Banks, Veronica Webb, Beverly Peele, and Eileen Ford were all there with Stephen Baldwin, David Copperfield, the Wayans brothers, Jon Stewart, Matt Lauer, RuPaul, and Molly Ringwald.

Criticized for its management of the restaurant chain, Tommaso Buti was finally granted a full pardon by President Donald Trump on 19 January 2021 before being tried on any charges.

Specifications
The Fashion Cafe’s facade was shiny and merchandised, resembled more of a souvenir gift shop than an eatery with a large steel nameplate and passerby-friendly glass window panes.

References

Defunct restaurant chains in the United States
Theme restaurants
Defunct restaurants in New York City
Restaurants established in 1995
1995 establishments in New York City